Joanne McCarthy may refer to:

Joanne McCarthy (basketball), an American basketball player
Joanne McCarthy (journalist), an Australian journalist

See also
Joanne McCartney, British politician